Genoa Football Club Youth Sector is the youth sections of Genoa, an Italian association football club based in Genoa, Liguria. Their under-19 team, participated in Campionato Primavera 2. They also participate in the Coppa Italia Primavera.

The under-17 team of the youth sector has participated in the Campionato Allievi Nazionali.

Primavera

Current squad

Out on loan

Coaching staff

Honours
Campionato Primavera 1:
Winners(1): 2009/10
Coppa Italia Primavera:
Winners(1): 2008/09
Supercoppa Primavera:
Winners(2): 2009, 2010
Viareggio Cup:
Winners(2): 1965, 2007
Runners-up(2): 2005, 2019

U18 Men

Current squad

Out on loan

Coaching staff

Honours
Campionato Nazionale U18:
Winners(1): 2020/21

U17 Men

Current squad

Coaching staff

Honours
Campionato Nazionale U17:
Runners-up(2): 2006/07, 2020/21

Juniores Women

Current Squad

Coaching staff

U17 Women

Current squad

Coaching staff

References

External links
  

Primavera
Football academies in Italy